In the majority of nations, including all industrialised nations except the United States, advances in employee relations have seen the introduction of statutory agreements for minimum employee leave from work—that is the amount of entitlement to paid vacation and public holidays. Companies may offer contractually more time. Companies and the law may also differ as to whether public holidays are counted as part of the minimum leave.

Disparities in national minimums are still subject of debate regarding work-life balance and perceived differences between nations. These numbers usually refer to full-time employment – part-time workers may get a reduced number of days. In most countries, public holidays are paid and usually not considered part of the annual leave. Also, in most countries there are additional paid leave benefits such as parental leave and sick leave that are not listed here.

Methodology 
For the purpose of comparison, the paid vacation column has been normalised to a five-day workweek. For instance, a calendar month is divided by seven and multiplied by five, while a six-day workweek day is divided by six and multiplied by five. The paid vacation column gives the minimum mandatory vacation days for an employee who has one year of service with the same employer.

In some countries, the public holidays are strictly bound to the calendar dates, so if they happen on Saturday or Sunday, they are "lost" for that year. As a result, the average number of paid extra free days can be lower than the table shows. For example, in the Czech Republic, where the official number of paid public holidays is 13, the average number of public holidays during working days in the years 2000–2016 was only 8.9 days. In other countries, such as the United Kingdom and the United States, the public holidays which would fall on Saturday or Sunday are moved to the nearest Monday or Friday.

Countries

See also
Annual leave
Long service leave
Parental leave
List of holidays by country

References

External links
6 people from around the world share what it's like to have nationally mandated work vacation. Business Insider. 16 October 2017

Lists by country
Leave of absence
Society-related lists